Fudōshin is a state of equanimity or imperturbability (literally and metaphorically, "immovable mind", "immovable heart" or "unmoving heart"). It is a philosophical or mental dimension to Japanese martial arts which contributes to the effectiveness of the advanced practitioner.

Fudō Myōō is found in Shingon Buddhism as a guardian deity,  (and patron of martial arts) who is portrayed as carrying a sword in his right hand (to cut through delusions and ignorance) and a rope in his left (to bind "evil forces" and violent or uncontrolled passions and emotions). Despite a fearsome appearance, his attributes of benevolence and servitude to living beings are symbolized by a hairstyle associated with the servant class.

See also
Martial arts
Bushido
Mushin mental state
Zanshin
Shoshin
Religions of Japan

References

Japanese aesthetics
Japanese martial arts terminology